The Enshi–Jishou railway is a planned railway line in China.

History 
In March and April 2022, preliminary meetings took place.

Specification 
The line will run south from Enshi railway station on the Yichang–Wanzhou railway to Jishou railway station on the Jiaozuo–Liuzhou railway. It is expected to be a general speed railway not exceeding .

References 

Proposed railway lines in China